Age Before Beauty is a BBC television drama series by Debbie Horsfield that premiered on BBC One on 31 July 2018. The six-part series is based in Manchester, England, and stars Robson Green, Sue Johnston, Polly Walker and James Murray.

Plot
Age Before Beauty is a family drama set in a Manchester beauty salon. The series follows Bel, a homemaker and mother-of-two, as she deals with the demands of her family's struggling salon business and her warring family with the problems in her marriage.

Cast and characters
Robson Green as Teddy Roxton, Bel's brother-in-law and best friend.
Sue Johnston as Ivy-Rae Regan, Bel's mother and a spray tan technician in the family's salon.
Polly Walker as Bel Finch, a homemaker and mother who takes over her family's salon business.
James Murray as Wesley Finch, Bel's husband of 25 years.
Lisa Riley as Tina Regan, Bel's sister and a tattoo artist in the family's salon.
Kelly Harrison as Leanne Roxton, Bel's obnoxious sister and a nail technician and personal stylist in the family's salon.
Vicky Myers as Heidi Regan, Bel's sister, a cosmetic surgery addict and mother to seven-year-old Disney, a wannabe pageant queen.
Madeleine Mantock as Lorelei Bailey, a personal trainer in her twenties.

Episodes

Production
Filming for the series began in June 2017 in the Northern Quarter, Manchester.

References

External links
 

2018 British television series debuts
2018 British television series endings
2010s British drama television series
2010s British television miniseries
BBC television dramas
English-language television shows
Television shows based on British novels
Television series about dysfunctional families
Television series about marriage
Television shows set in Manchester